Alcobaça River may refer to:
 Alcobaça River (Brazil)
 Alcobaça River (Portugal)